The men's singles competition of the table tennis event at the 2007 Southeast Asian Games was held from 9 to 10 December at the Klang Plaza in Nakhon Ratchasima, Thailand.

Schedule
All times are Thailand Time (UTC+07:00).

Results

Preliminaries

Pool 1

Pool 2

Pool 3

Pool 4

Elimination rounds

Semifinals

Gold medal match

References

External links
 

2007 in table tennis
2007 Southeast Asian Games events